The United States Army Military District of Washington (MDW) is one of nineteen major commands of the United States Army. Its headquarters are located at Fort Lesley J. McNair in Washington, D.C. The missions of the units in the Military District of Washington include ceremonial tasks as well as a combat role in the defense of the National Capital Region.

Besides Fort McNair, the following installations are included under the umbrella of the MDW's command: 
Joint Base Myer–Henderson Hall, Virginia
Fort Belvoir, Virginia
Fort A.P. Hill, Virginia
Fort Meade, Maryland

The Military District of Washington also represents the U.S. Army in the Joint Force Headquarters National Capital Region (JFHQ-NCR), as well as oversight of all ceremonial operations in Arlington National Cemetery.

The current Commanding General of the Military District of Washington is Major General Allan M. Pepin. The Military District of Washington Chief of Staff, and liaison to the JFHQ-NCR, is Colonel Gregory B. Beaudoin. The Commanding General, Chief of Staff, and Command Sergeant Major of the Military District of Washington hold the same positions at the JFHQ-NCR, which supervises military planning for the defense of the National Capital Region.

History
The MDW can trace its origin back to the American Civil War when it was formed on March 12, 1862, as the Military District of Washington, and it included the areas of the District of Columbia, Alexandria, Virginia, and Fort Washington, Maryland. It was first under the command of Bvt. Major General James S. Wadsworth. It became part of the Department of Washington under the 22nd Army Corps on February 2, 1863 and it was disbanded in 1869.

The MDW was reformed in 1921 when the War Department created the District of Washington. Today MDW is one of the Army's major commands. Its installations include Fort McNair, the nation's third-oldest military post still in use, and Fort Myer, Gen. Philip Sheridan's cavalry showplace and site of the first military aircraft flight.

The District of Washington initially included Fort Washington, Md., Fort Hunt, Va., the District of Columbia and Fort Myer. With the dissolution of the District of Washington in 1927, the commanding general of the 16th Infantry Brigade at Fort Hunt became responsible for conducting military ceremonies and administering discipline to service members in the nation's capital.

In 1942, about five months after the U.S. entered World War II, the War Department created the U.S. Army Military District of Washington to plan for a ground defense of the nation's capital.

MDW was headquartered during those years in "temporary" buildings at Gravelly Point, Virginia., near Washington National Airport. It moved to Second Street, S.W., in Washington, D.C., in the early 1960s, and to its present headquarters at Fort Lesley J. McNair in 1966.

During the World War II era, MDW was gradually reorganized as a service-and-support command. One of MDW's main responsibilities was servicing the newly built Pentagon through the Army Headquarters commandant. The United States Army Band, "Pershing's Own," also became an integral part of the command's ceremonial mission during this period.

At the end of World War II, the 3rd U.S. Infantry Regiment (The Old Guard) was deactivated in Germany. This regiment, the oldest U.S. infantry unit, was reactivated in 1948 and assigned to MDW to meet the command's tactical commitments and for military ceremonies.

Although MDW's mission has remained the same, it has gained, lost and regained various installations and support responsibilities over the years. Vint Hill Farms and Arlington Hall Station, both in Virginia, and Walter Reed Army Medical Center in Washington, D.C., were once part of MDW. Cameron Station and Davison Army Airfield, near Fort Belvoir, joined MDW in the 1950s.

In 1980 MDW gained responsibility for the administration and daily operation of Arlington National Cemetery, in addition to the ceremonial support the command has always provided.

In 1987 MDW's support responsibilities for the Pentagon were transferred elsewhere. Fort Belvoir became a major subordinate command in 1988.

In 1992 Davison Aviation Command was reorganized as the Operational Support Airlift Command, with responsibilities for fixed-wing Army aircraft support throughout the United States. Additionally, they provide rotary-wing (helicopter) support to Army leadership and distinguished officials in the National Capital Region.

In April 1993, MDW reorganized its MACOM staff and the Fort Myer Military Community formed a garrison staff to support Forts Myer and McNair, and Cameron Station.

On 1 October 1993, Fort Meade, and Fort Ritchie in Maryland, and A.P. Hill in Virginia joined the MDW family of installations. The command more than doubled in size as MDW went from four posts totaling  to eight posts totaling . The number of service members and civilians on MDW installations also increased from 16,166 to 61,531.

Cameron Station officially closed on 30 September 1995. Most of the organizations were relocated to either Fort Belvoir or Fort Myer.

Fort Hamilton, New York, became the newest member of MDW's family of installations when it was transferred to MDW from U.S. Army Forces Command 6 October 1997. The post is 172 years old.

On 10 June 2010, Secretary of the Army John M. McHugh rescinded MDW's responsibility for the administration and daily operation of Arlington National Cemetery.  However, MDW still maintains ceremonial support for funerals and guarding the Tomb of the Unknown Soldier.

Ceremonial duties
The Military District of Washington is responsible for organizing state funerals, including those of former presidents.Presidential Funerals and Burials: Selected Resources, Congressional Research Service (December 20, 2019).

Organization 
Current units commanded by the district include;

 The United States Army Band "Pershing's Own"
 The United States Army Field Band
 Regimental Headquarters and Headquarters Company, 3rd U.S. Infantry Regiment (The Old Guard)
Caisson Platoon
Commander-in-Chief's Guard
Continental Color Guard
The Old Guard Fife and Drum Corps 
Presidential Salute Battery
Tomb of the Unknown Soldier Sentinals
The United States Army Drill Team 
1st Battalion, 3rd U.S. Infantry Regiment (The Old Guard) (Infantry)
 Headquarters and Headquarters Company, 1st Battalion
B Company
C Company
D Company
H Company
1st Battalion Chaplains Group
4th Battalion, 3rd U.S. Infantry Regiment (The Old Guard) (Ceremonial)
Headquarters and Headquarters Company, 4th Battalion
529th Regimental Support Company
A Company
Honor Guard Company
289th Military Police Company
Regimental Fife and Drum Corps
United States Army Transportation Agency
 The Army Aviation Brigade
 United States Army Priority Air Transportation (Jet) Detachment
 12th Aviation Battalion
 Army Aviation Brigade Airfield Division

Insignia

Shoulder sleeve insignia

Description: On a blue oval 2 7/8 inches in height fimbriated white within a 3/16-inch red border, issuing from a green mount in base fimbriated argent, the Washington Monument of the last superimposed by a red double-handed sword bendwise, fimbriated white, hilt and pommel yellow; all fimbriations 1/32-inch.
Symbolism:
The functions of the organization are indicated by the double-handed sword, symbolic of protection, over the Washington Monument, representing the area concerned.
The blue represents the Navy and the Infantry; the scarlet the Field Artillery, Coast Artillery and Engineers, and the green and gold the Military Police.
Background:
The shoulder sleeve insignia was originally approved for Military District of Washington on 1942-09-26
Redesignated for US Army Military District of Washington on 1971-07-21.

Distinctive unit insignia
Description: A gold color metal and enamel device 1 3/16 inches in height overall consisting of an oval its upper half blue and containing a gold star in the center, the lower half divided into seven stripes alternately white and red. Bordering the bottom of the oval, a semicircular gold scroll inscribed with the words HAEC PROTEGIMUS in black, the scroll ends folded twice and forked with the points up below a border of gold oak leaves terminating at either side of a gold acorn with point up at top center, crossed in front two swords their gold hilts emerging from the folds of the scroll and their white blades terminating outside the oak leaf border.
Symbolism:
The background of the National colors refers to the seat of the government, which lies within the Military District of Washington, with the dome-shaped upper part suggesting the Capitol building.
The Command's responsibilities of conducting ceremonies for the President of the United States and foreign dignitaries, Medal of Honor presentations, military funerals and guarding the Tomb of the Unknown Soldier are represented by the gold star.
The oak leaves symbolize strength and courage and the crossed swords indicate the command's mission to defend the Nation's Capital.
The motto translates to "This We Guard."
Background:
The distinctive unit insignia was originally approved for Headquarters, Military District of Washington on 1968-09-06;
Revised to delete Headquarters from the designation on 1968-10-28;
Redesignated for US Army Military District of Washington on 1971-07-21.

List of commanders

See also
 Naval District Washington
 Air Force District of Washington

References
 Eicher, John H., and David J. Eicher. Civil War High Commands. Stanford, CA: Stanford University Press, 2001. .

External links
Military District of Washington

United States Army Direct Reporting Units
Military in Washington, D.C.
Departments and districts of the United States Army